"Hate My Heart" is a song written by Carrie Underwood, Hillary Lindsey, Hardy, and David Garcia. It was released as the second single from Underwood's ninth studio album, Denim & Rhinestones.

Background and composition
"Hate My Heart" is told from the point of view of a character who is regretful over her breakup, wishing she could move on. "‘Hate My Heart’ was definitely part of my desire to have fun on this album," Underwood said via a statement. "I wanted songs that would be exciting to perform live and would fill up an arena, and that’s exactly what we’re about to do with The Denim & Rhinestones Tour. This one is definitely going to get everyone up on their feet and having a good time. It was great writing ‘Hate My Heart’ with Hillary Lindsey and David Garcia, who I love collaborating with, and also getting to work with HARDY, who brought a cool vibe and an energy to the track." "I have a love for 90's and 2000s rock as well as 90's and 2000s country. I feel like I kind of married those genres and times together. It is a super fun song that I feel like accomplished everything that I wanted to accomplish," she said.

Music video
The music video was directed by Shaun Silva and premiered on November 2, 2022. It depicts Underwood and four friends as each go through a breakup. They end up at the Wildhorse Saloon in Nashville for a girls' night, where an all-female band (made up of doppelgangers of Underwood and her friends) is playing.

Live performances
Underwood performed the song at the CMA Awards on November 9, 2022. The song is included in the setlist for the Denim & Rhinestones Tour.

Charts

References

2022 singles
2022 songs
Capitol Records Nashville singles
Carrie Underwood songs
Songs written by David Garcia (musician)
Songs written by Hillary Lindsey
Songs written by Hardy (singer)
Songs written by Carrie Underwood